Andlersdorf is a town in the district of Gänserndorf in Lower Austria in Austria.

Geography
Andlersdorf lies in the south Marchfeld. About 3.55 percent of the municipality is forested.

References

Cities and towns in Gänserndorf District
Croatian communities in Austria